The 1889–90 season was Newton Heath LYR's first season in the Football Alliance; they finished in 8th position. The club also took part in the FA Cup and the Lancashire Senior Cup, failing to get past the First Round in both competitions, as well as the Manchester and District Challenge Cup, in which they came out winners.

Football Alliance

FA Cup

Lancashire Senior Cup

Manchester and District Challenge Cup

Squad statistics

References

Manchester United F.C. seasons
Newton Heath LYR